Verena Mayr (former Preiner) born 1 February 1995 is an Austrian athlete who specialises in the heptathlon. She won the bronze medal at the 2019 World Championships. In the 2020 Summer Olympics she finished 11th.

Personal bests

Outdoor

Indoor

References

External links

 

1995 births
Living people
Austrian female athletes
Austrian heptathletes
Universiade medalists in athletics (track and field)
Universiade gold medalists for Austria
Athletes (track and field) at the 2015 European Games
European Games gold medalists for Austria
European Games medalists in athletics
World Athletics Championships athletes for Austria
World Athletics Championships medalists
Medalists at the 2017 Summer Universiade
Athletes (track and field) at the 2020 Summer Olympics
Olympic athletes of Austria
People from Gmunden District
Sportspeople from Upper Austria
20th-century Austrian women
21st-century Austrian women